is a railway station in the city of Nagano, Nagano Prefecture, Japan.

Lines
Imai Station is served by the Shin'etsu Main Line and is 2.1 kilometers from the terminus of the line at Shinonoi Station.

Station layout
The station consists of two opposed elevated side platforms serving two tracks, with the station building underneath. The station has a Midori no Madoguchi staffed ticket office.

Platforms

History
Imai Station opened on 1 October 1997.

Passenger statistics
In fiscal 2015, the station was used by an average of 1,966 passengers daily (boarding passengers only).

See also
 List of railway stations in Japan

References

External links

 JR East station information 

Stations of East Japan Railway Company
Railway stations in Japan opened in 1997
Railway stations in Nagano (city)
Shin'etsu Main Line
Shinonoi Line
Shinano Railway Line